In geometric modelling and in computer graphics, a composite Bézier curve or Bézier spline is a spline made out of Bézier curves that is at least  continuous. In other words, a composite Bézier curve is a series of Bézier curves joined end to end where the last point of one curve coincides with the starting point of the next curve.

A continuous composite Bézier is also called a polybezier, by similarity to polyline, but whereas in polylines the points are connected by straight lines, in a polybezier the points are connected by Bézier curves. A beziergon (also called bezigon) is a closed path composed of Bézier curves. It is similar to a polygon in that it connects a set of vertices by lines, but whereas in polygons the vertices are connected by straight lines, in a beziergon the vertices are connected by Bézier curves. Some authors even call a  composite Bézier curve a "Bézier spline"; the latter term is however used by other authors as a synonym for the (non-composite) Bézier curve, and they add "composite" in front of "Bézier spline" to denote the composite case.

Perhaps the most common use of composite Béziers is to describe the outline of each letter in a PostScript or PDF file. Such outlines are composed of one beziergon for open letters, or multiple beziergons for closed letters. Modern vector graphics and computer font systems like PostScript, Asymptote, Metafont, OpenType, and SVG use composite Bézier curves composed of cubic Bézier curves (3rd order curves) for drawing curved shapes.

Smooth joining
A commonly desired property of splines is for them to join their individual curves together with a specified level of parametric or geometric continuity. While individual curves in the spline are fully  continuous within their own interval, there is always some amount of discontinuity where different curves meet.

It is, however, possible to arrange control points to guarantee various levels of continuity across joins, though this can come at a loss of local control if the constraint is too strict for the given degree of the Bézier spline.

Smoothly joining cubic Béziers 
Given two cubic Bézier curves with control points  and  respectively, the constraints for ensuring continuity at  can be defined as follows:

  (positional continuity) requires that they meet at the same point, which all Bézier splines do by definition. In this example, the shared point is 

  (velocity continuity) requires the neighboring control points around the join to be mirrors of each other. In other words, they must follow the constraint of 

  (tangent continuity) requires the neighboring control points to be collinear with the join. This is less strict than  continuity, leaving an extra degree of freedom which can be parameterized using a scalar . The constraint can then be expressed by 

While the following continuity constraints are possible, they are rarely used with cubic Bézier splines, as other splines like the B-spline or the β-spline will naturally handle higher constraints without loss of local control.

However, applying this constraint across an entire cubic Bézier spline will cause a cascading loss of local control over the tangent points. The curve will still pass through every third point in the spline, but control over its shape will be lost. In order to achieve  continuity using cubic curves, it's recommended to use a cubic uniform B-spline instead, as it ensures  continuity without loss of local control, at the expense of no longer being guaranteed to pass through specific points

Higher degrees of geometric continuity is possible, though they get increasingly complex

Applying this constraint to the cubic Bézier spline will cause a complete loss of local control, as the entire spline is now fully constrained and defined by the first curve's control points. In fact, it is arguably no longer a spline, as its shape is now equivalent to extrapolating the first curve indefinitely, making it not only  continuous, but , as joins between separate curves no longer exist

Approximating circular arcs
In case circular arc primitives are not supported in a particular environment, they may be approximated by Bézier curves. Commonly, eight quadratic segments or four cubic segments are used to approximate a circle. It is desirable to find the length  of control points which result in the least approximation error for a given number of cubic segments.

Using four curves

From the definition of the cubic Bézier curve, we have:

With the point  as the midpoint of the arc, we may write the following two equations:

Solving these equations for the x-coordinate (and identically for the y-coordinate) yields:

Note however that the resulting Bézier curve is entirely outside the circle, with a maximum deviation of the radius of about 0.00027.
By adding a small correction to intermediate points such as 

the magnitude of the radius deviation to 1 is reduced by a factor of about 3, to 0.000068 (at the expense of the derivability of the approximated circle curve at endpoints).

General case
We may compose a circle of radius  from an arbitrary number of cubic Bézier curves.
Let the arc start at point  and end at point , placed at equal distances above and below the x-axis, spanning an arc of angle :

The control points may be written as:

Examples

Fonts
TrueType fonts use composite Béziers composed of quadratic Bézier curves (2nd order curves). To describe a typical type design as a computer font to any given accuracy, 3rd order Beziers require less data than 2nd order Beziers; and these in turn require less data than a series of straight lines. This is true even though any one straight line segment requires less data than any one segment of a parabola; and that parabolic segment in turn requires less data than any one segment of a 3rd order curve.

See also
 B-spline

References

Splines (mathematics)